James Joseph Killane (22 October 1874 – 26 April 1930) was an Irish politician. He was first elected to Dáil Éireann as a Sinn Féin Teachta Dála (TD) for the Longford–Westmeath constituency at the 1923 general election. 

He lost his seat at the June 1927 general election but was re-elected at the September 1927 general election as a Fianna Fáil TD. He died during the 6th Dáil and the by-election caused by his death, held on 13 June 1930, was won by James Geoghegan of Fianna Fáil.

References

1874 births
1930 deaths
Fianna Fáil TDs
Members of the 4th Dáil
Members of the 6th Dáil
Early Sinn Féin TDs